Marcel Philippe (born 16 September 1951) is a French middle-distance runner. Born in New York City to a french father, he attended Mater Christi High School, where he set the still standing New York State Record in the 880 yds. While attending Fordham University, he was the 1973 NCAA Indoor Track and Field Champion. He still holds the Fordham record for indoor mile, 1000 yards, and outdoor 800m. At the 1976 Summer Olympics       he competed in the men's 800 metres. Philippe set multiple french records in the 800m, 1000m and 4x1500m relay distances. He won both the 1973 and 1974 French Athletics Championships in the 800m.

  Marcel Philippe participated in the 1973 European Cup, placing second to Dieter Fromm in the semi final despite improving his french 800m record with a time of 1:45.79. He won a silver medal at the World University Games in Moscow, narrowly losing to Yevgeniy Arzhanov, the Munich 1972 Olympics silver medalist.  That same year he beat Arzhanov to the line in the U.S 1973 Indoor Track and Field Championships, placing first in the 1000 yds with a time of 2:08.8.

References

External links
 

1951 births
Living people
Athletes (track and field) at the 1976 Summer Olympics
French male middle-distance runners
Olympic athletes of France
Place of birth missing (living people)
Universiade silver medalists for France
Universiade medalists in athletics (track and field)
Medalists at the 1973 Summer Universiade